Skuteč is a town in Chrudim District in the Pardubice Region of the Czech Republic. It has about 5,000 inhabitants.

Administrative parts
Villages of Borek, Hněvětice, Lažany, Lešany, Lhota u Skutče, Nová Ves, Radčice, Skutíčko, Štěpánov, Zbožnov, Zhoř and the town part of Žďárec u Skutče are administrative parts of Skuteč. Lešany forms an exclave of the municipal territory.

Geography
It lies mostly the undulating and hilly landscape of the Iron Mountains, the northern part of the municipal territory extends into the Svitavy Uplands. A part of the Anenské Valley Nature Reserve around the Anenský Brook is located in the territory.

History
The first written mention of Skuteč is from 1289. The settlement was located on a side trade route. Skuteč was promoted to a town probably in the first half of the 14th century. It was one of the larger towns in the region. Its development was slowed down by the Thirty Years' War. In 1862 and 1867, the town was severely damaged by large fires.

Demographics

Economy
Skuteč is significantly associated with shoemaking tradition, represented by the company Botas, a.s, and for mining of granite. While mining is still active, shoe production in Skuteč has ended in 2022, and it is being considered to move the brand's production elsewhere.

Education
The town has two elementary schools and Vítězslav Novák Art School. Since 2000, there is the Gymnasium of the Sovereign Maltese Knights Order.

Culture
Since 2003, the town hosts Tomášek's and Novák's Musical Skuteč, an annual festival of classical music and choir singing.

Sights

The most notable buildings are the churches. In Skuteč there are Church of the Assumption of the Virgin Mary and Church of the Corpus Christi. The Church of Saint Wenceslaus is located in Lažany and the Church of Saint Matthias is in Štěpánov.

The birthplace of the most famous native, composer Václav Tomášek, is a folk architecture house from the 18th century with a small exhibition of his life and work.

Notable people
Václav Tomášek (1774–1850), composer and music teacher
Vítězslav Novák (1870–1949), composer; lived and died here
Jaromír Funke (1896–1945), photographer
Jiří Zástěra (1913–1983), football player and manager
Jan Tesař (born 1933), historian
Tomáš Malinský (born 1991), footballer

References

External links

Populated places in Chrudim District
Cities and towns in the Czech Republic